Trochoidea elegans is a species of European air-breathing land snail, a terrestrial pulmonate gastropod mollusk in the family Geomitridae, the hairy snails and their allies.

Distribution

This species is known to occur in a number of European countries and islands including:
 Great Britain
 France
 Belgium
 Germany
 Spain
 Italy, including Sardinia

References

 Provoost, S.; Bonte, D. (Ed.) (2004). Animated dunes: a view of biodiversity at the Flemish coast [Levende duinen: een overzicht van de biodiversiteit aan de Vlaamse kust]. Mededelingen van het Instituut voor Natuurbehoud, 22. Instituut voor Natuurbehoud: Brussel, Belgium. ISBN 90-403-0205-7. 416, ill., appendices pp

External links
 Image of a large group of shells at: 
 Gmelin J.F. (1791). Vermes. In: Gmelin J.F. (Ed.) Caroli a Linnaei Systema Naturae per Regna Tria Naturae, Ed. 13. Tome 1(6). G.E. Beer, Lipsiae

Trochoidea (genus)
Gastropods described in 1791
Taxa named by Johann Friedrich Gmelin

pt:Trochoidea